Éric Lapointe (born 28 September 1969) is a francophone lead singer and guitarist for his eponymous band. His band is characterized by a heavy metal style containing elements of punk, grunge, pop, and hard rock from guitarist Stéphane Dufour's riffs. Lapointe has released eight studio albums, three compilation albums, and two live albums. He is currently the most successful male music artist in French Canadian history in terms of sales, having sold more than one million total discs. He has also made film appearances.

Biography

Childhood
Born in Montreal, Quebec, Canada, Lapointe is the eldest of three children; he has two brothers, Marc and Hugo. Hugo is also a singer and started as a technician for his brother's band.  Their father, Serge, was in the military and his family often had to move. By the age of 16, Lapointe had moved a total of 13 times. As a result, he was shy and reserved, had difficulty making friends, and stayed close to his mother, Doris.

At nine years old, Lapointe asked his father for a plastic guitar from a Sears catalogue. His father bought him a real guitar instead, and Lapointe soon learned how to strum chords, thanks to the help of his uncle, who was also a musician. He wrote his first songs at the age of ten and started touring Quebec and France at the age of 15.

Early career
At the age of 18, Lapointe joined the Parti Québécois and was discovered by Yves-François Blanchet (former president of l'ADISQ) who went on to manage his early career. Lapointe started out by playing at local bars and CEGEPs. To supplement his income, Lapointe worked side jobs as a pool installation technician, garbage collector, waiter and credit card salesman.

At the age of 20, Lapointe collaborated with Roger Tabra, writing his first hit single "N'importe quoi" ("Anything"). Despite having little money, Lapointe organized a showcase at a popular bar called Club Soda for record industry scouts. A representative of Disques Gamma, Patrice Duchesne, was impressed by Lapointe's talent and offered him a record contract. Gamma helped produce his debut album Obsession which was released in 1994. Aldo Nova produced the album, which caused some internal friction within the band.

1994–1995:  Release of Obsession, rise to popularity
Local radio stations initially refused to play Lapointe's music. However, the video for his first single, "," found a new fan base and helped trigger sales. On 12 August 1994, Lapointe played for a crowd of 45,000 people at the corner of Jeanne-Mance and Saint Catherine in Montreal. Obsession was later certified platinum with over 250,000 copies sold.

In 1995, the Rolling Stones invited him to open their two Paris concerts during the Voodoo Lounge Tour along with Bon Jovi. They also played a concert at la Rochelle FrancoFolies festival along with French artist Florent Pagny.

1996–2007:  Continued success

Lapointe and his band produced several other albums including Invitez les Vautours ("Invite the Vultures," 1996, 180,000 copies sold), À l'ombre de l'ange ("In the Shadow of the Angel," 1999, 225,000 copies) and Adrénaline, a live album which sold as of 2006 nearly 200,000 copies. In November 2004, Lapointe launched Coupable ("Guilty") and sold over 100,000 copies in its first few weeks. His first five albums were certified platinum and sold 900,000 total discs in 12 years.

On 8 April 2002, he launched Adrénaline, a double-album containing 25 live tracks that includes several covers. He also participated in the compilation of Le Petit Roi, and was especially noticed for his interpretation of "Une chance qu'on s'a" by Jean-Pierre Ferland.

Lapointe released the album Coupable a few weeks later, which quickly reached platinum status. The most notable hit was "La Bartendresse", featuring a video written by Quebec actor Patrick Huard. Lapointe wrote the vast majority of this album.

On 22 November 2006, Lapointe released a greatest hits album called 1994-2006: N'importe Qui.

In 2007, he made a guest appearance on the eponymous song of Dennis DeYoung's album One Hundred Years from Now as a singer and lyricist.

2008–present
On 22 April 2008, Lapointe's fifth studio album, was released. Before its release, Dufour, who had been the band's guitarist since before Obsession, and Lapointe parted ways.

The 2009 compilation album,  includes duets with Céline Dion, Isabelle Boulay, Dan Bigras, Nanette Workman, and Les Divans, as well as a trio with Garou and Claude Dubois. The Dion duet is a remake of her 1991 hit "". A cover album entitled Volume 2 was released later in 2009.

Lapointe also teamed with Marjo for a remake of her 1990 hit "Ailleurs" as a blues-rock ballad. It appears on her greatest hits remakes album .

Lapointe's latest studio album, was released on 30 November 2010. His sixth studio release features the return of Roger Tabra as cowriter, Aldo Nova on guitar, and Dufour as producer. These songs deal with themes such as friendship and suicide. As of 2011, Lapointe collaborated with the Montreal Symphony Orchestra to create Lapointe Symphonique.

Since 2014, he is one of the four judges of La Voix, the Quebec version of The Voice.

In 2020 he pleaded guilty to assaulting a woman in 2019.

Filmography

In 1997, Lapointe released two songs: "Le Screw" (written by Richard Desjardins) and "Les Boys", written for the movie of the same name. In 1998, he wrote two more songs for Les Boys II: "Rocket" and "Alléluia." The soundtrack sold 25,000 copies in six weeks. He also produced seven additional songs for the soundtrack of Les Boys III including "Le Boys Blues Band." Released in 2001, this album sold 35,000 copies. Lapointe also cameoed as Bruno in several episodes of the television series.

Lapointe went on to work on Bon Cop Bad Cop with Patrick Huard, contributing his song "Tattoo" which became an instant hit. He also played the role of a notorious criminal named Johnny "" Charland in the Quebec television series Le Négociateur which aired on TVA in 2005 and 2006.

Awards

In 1995, Éric Lapointe was nominated for and won a series of awards. Nominated for five Félix Awards in all, he won Breakthrough Artist of the Year and Best Rock Album at the Gala de l'ADISQ. He was also nominated for Best Male Artist of the year, Best Album Sales, and Best Composer-Author-Performer of the Year. He also received three record industry nominations. In 1995, he became the first artist to receive two Prix Miroir in each the Public Choice and Best Public Performance categories at the Quebec City Summer Festival. Lapointe also received an award from Francophone radio stations for best song in 1995 for "Terre Promise." "N'importe quoi" was voted best song by the Québec public on Radio Énergie radio stations across the province.

Lapointe was nominated for three more Félix awards in 1997; Éric won his second for Best Rock Album. In 2000, À l'ombre de l'ange garnered five additional Félix wins. Adrénaline also garnered a fourth Félix for Best Rock Album. He again won the Public Choice Award at the Quebec City Summer Festival in 1997 and 2000, becoming the first artist to receive four awards in the event's 30-year run. Radio Énergie also voted Lapointe's singles "Loadé comme un gun" in 1997 and "Mon ange" in 1999 as the People's Choice for Song of the Year.

Singles

Overall, Lapointe has had nearly 30 No. 1 hits on the Quebec charts, which were either on Radio Energie network, Montreal's Francophone station CKOI, the Rock Détente network, or MusiquePlus:
 N'importe quoi
 Terre promise (poussé par le vent)
 Marie Stone
 L'exquise
 Je rêve encore
 Deux fois la même histoire
 D'l'amour, j'en veux pus
 Bobépine
 Loadé comme un gun
 Les Boys
 Rocket
 Laisse-moi seul
 Rien à regretter
 On commence à s'quitter
 Mon ange
 Ma gueule
 Le Boys Blues Band
 Qu'est-ce que ça peut ben faire?
 Un beau grand slow
 Reste là
 La Bartendresse
 Coupable
 100 Years From Now
 Toucher
 1500 Miles

The band

Current musicians
 Martin Bolduc – bass
 Rick Bourque – drums
 Bruce Cameron – keys
 Mic Myette – guitars
 Stephane Dufour – Guitars
 Rosa Laricchiuta – Back Vocals

Past musicians
 Adrien Bance – guitars
 Stéphane Campeau – bass
 Dennis Chatrand – keyboard, organ
 Ange E. Curcio – Drums (1996–2006)
 Stéphane Dufour – guitars (1994–2007)
 Tino Izzo – guitars
 Aldo Nova – piano, keyboards, guitars
 Claude Pineault – Guitars,Back Vocals

Discography

Studio albums
 Obsession (1994)
 Invitez les vautours (1996)
 À l'ombre de l'ange (1999)
 Coupable (2004)
 Ma peau (2008)
 Le ciel de mes combats (2010)
 Jour de Nuit (2013)
 delivrance (2018)

Live albums
 Adrénaline (2002) (Platinum)
 Lapointe Symphonique (2011)

Compilations
 Invitez les vautours (2002 Digipak Re-release with DVD)
 1994-2006: N'importe qui (2006) (Gold)
 Ailleurs, Volume 1 and Volume 2 (2009)

Soundtracks
 Les Boys (1997)
 Les Boys II (1998)
 Les Boys III (2001)
 Bon cop, bad cop (2006)

References

External links
  Éric Lapointe official website

1969 births
Living people
French Quebecers
Canadian rock singers
Canadian male singers
French-language singers of Canada
Singers from Montreal